Ixos is a genus of passerine birds  in the bulbul family, Pycnonotidae.

Taxonomy and systematics
The genus Ixos was introduced in 1825 by the Dutch zoologist Coenraad Jacob Temminck to accommodate the Javan bulbul. The genus name is the Ancient Greek for "mistletoe".

Some authorities have advocated a complete merger of the genus Ixos with Hypsipetes – and even the entire "Hypsipetes group" of bulbuls, which also includes Hemixos, Iole and Tricholestes. Being the oldest genus name, Ixos would apply to all of them, rather than Hypsipetes as is often believed. This re-classification seems hardly appropriate however, since Alophoixus and Setornis cannot be excluded from the "Hypsipetes group", and an all-out merge would turn the resultant "genus" Ixos into an ill-defined  "wastebin taxon". The erroneous inclusion of I. virescens in Hypsipetes has caused the Nicobar bulbul to be listed under its invalid junior synonym H. nicobariensis rather than the valid names H. virescens or I. nicobariensis.

Extant species
There are five extant species in the genus Ixos:
 Nicobar bulbul (Ixos nicobariensis)
 Mountain bulbul (Ixos mcclellandii)
 Streaked bulbul (Ixos malaccensis)
 Javan bulbul (Ixos virescens) (the type species)
 Sumatran bulbul (Ixos sumatranus) (split from I. virescens)

Former species
Formerly, some authorities also considered the following species (or subspecies) as species within the genus Ixos:
 Cream-striped bulbul (as Ixos leucogrammicus)
 Spot-necked bulbul (as Ixos tympanistrigus)
 Grey-headed bulbul (as Ixos Fisquetti)
 Scaly-breasted bulbul (as Ixos squamatus)
 Red-whiskered bulbul (pyrrhotis) (as Ixos pyrrhotis)
 Red-whiskered bulbul (emeria) (as Ixos emeria)
 Chinese red-whiskered bulbul (as Ixos monticola)
 Brown-breasted bulbul (andersoni) (as Ixus Andersoni)
 Light-vented bulbul (hainanus) (as Ixus hainanus)
 White-eared bulbul (as Ixos leucotis)
 Sooty-headed bulbul (germani) (as Ixus Germani)
 White-spectacled bulbul (as Ixus xanthopygos)
 Upper Guinea bulbul (as Ixos inornatus)
 Dark-capped bulbul (as Ixos tricolor)
 Pale-eyed bulbul (as Ixus Davisoni)
 Yellow-throated bulbul (as Ixos xantholaemus)
 Yellow-vented bulbul (gourdini) (as Ixos gourdini)
 Spectacled bulbul (as Ixos erythropthalmos)
 Yellow-throated leaflove (as Ixus flavicollis)
 Yellow-bellied bulbul (as Ixos phaeocephalus)
 Sulphur-bellied bulbul (as Ixos palawanensis)
 Seram golden bulbul (as Ixos affinis)
 Philippine bulbul (as Ixos philippinus)
 Mindoro bulbul (as Ixos mindorensis)
 Visayan bulbul (as Ixos guimarasensis)
 Zamboanga bulbul (as Ixos rufigularis)
 Streak-breasted bulbul (as Ixos siquijorensis)
 Yellowish bulbul (as Ixos everetti)
 Brown-eared bulbul (as Ixos amaurotis)

Footnotes

References
 Gregory, Steven M. (2000): Nomenclature of the Hypsipetes Bulbuls (Pycnonotidae). Forktail 16: 164–166. PDF fulltext
 Moyle, Robert G. & Marks, Ben D. (2006): Phylogenetic relationships of the bulbuls (Aves: Pycnonotidae) based on mitochondrial and nuclear DNA sequence data. Mol. Phylogenet. Evol. 40(3): 687–695.  (HTML abstract)
 Pasquet, Éric; Han, Lian-Xian; Khobkhet, Obhas & Cibois, Alice (2001): Towards a molecular systematics of the genus Criniger, and a preliminary phylogeny of the bulbuls (Aves, Passeriformes, Pycnonotidae). Zoosystema 23(4): 857–863. PDF fulltext

 
Bulbuls
Bird genera
Taxonomy articles created by Polbot